Vernon Keith McCreary (June 19, 1940 –  December 9, 2003) was a Canadian left winger in the National Hockey League who played for the Montreal Canadiens, Pittsburgh Penguins and Atlanta Flames.

Playing career
As property of the Montreal Canadiens, McCreary spent a seven years in the minor league system only promoted for a single playoff game in 1962 and 9 games during the 1964–65 season. During this time he was a top scorer for the Hull-Ottawa Canadiens.

He became an NHL regular with the Pittsburgh Penguins following the 1967 NHL Expansion. In 1972, he was claimed by the Atlanta Flames in the Expansion Draft and was designated the franchise's first captain. McCreary retired following the 1974–75 season after 532 NHL games. He recorded a total of 131 goals and 116 assists during his NHL career.

McCreary played for the Montreal Canadiens, Pittsburgh Penguins, Atlanta Flames, Hershey Bears, Hull-Ottawa Canadiens, and Cleveland Barons.

His brother, Bill McCreary Sr., was also an NHL left winger.

Life and retirement
McCreary is the brother of Bill McCreary Sr., the uncle of Bill McCreary Jr. and Bob Attwell, and the brother-in-law of Ron Attwell.

He was elected as Regional councillor for Caledon in 1978, eventually losing in the 1988 election against Carol Seglins, who would later become Mayor of Caledon. He stood for consideration in 1991, as a candidate for the appointed role of Regional Chair. Emil Kolb won.

McCreary joined the NHL Alumni Association and was the Association's chairman. He died after a long bout with cancer at the age of 63. He is buried at Laurel Hill Cemetery in Bolton, Ontario. 

His Atlanta Flames jersey is on display at the Hockey Hall of Fame.

Career statistics

Regular season and playoffs

Awards
EPHL First All-Star Team (1962) 
EPHL Second All-Star Team (1963)

Transactions
June 6, 1967 – Claimed by the Pittsburgh Penguins from the Montreal Canadiens in the 1967 NHL Expansion Draft.
June 6, 1972 – Claimed by the Atlanta Flames from the Pittsburgh Penguins in the 1972 NHL Expansion Draft.

References

External links

 

1940 births
2003 deaths
Atlanta Flames captains
Atlanta Flames players
Canadian ice hockey left wingers
Deaths from cancer
Hershey Bears players
Hull-Ottawa Canadiens players
Montreal Canadiens players
Ice hockey people from Ontario
Peterborough Petes (ice hockey) players
Pittsburgh Penguins players
Place of death missing